Dala Gewog (Dzongkha: དར་ལ་,Darla Gewog) is a gewog (village group) of Chukha District, Bhutan. The gewog has an area of 139.7 square kilometres and contains 7 villages. Dala Gewog is part of Phuentsholing Dungkhag, along with Logchina and Phuentsholing gewogs.

Dala Gewog
Dala, Bhutan

References

Gewogs of Bhutan
Chukha District